Taylor Rae McDonald (born May 12, 1993) is a Canadian curler from Edmonton. She currently plays lead on Team Casey Scheidegger. McDonald previously played second for Team Laura Walker and Team Kelsey Rocque, with whom she won gold at the 2014 World Junior Curling Championships and the 2017 Winter Universiade.

Career

Juniors
McDonald began her junior curling career in the 2011–12 season on Team Kelsey Rocque. In 2014, her team of Rocque, third Keely Brown, lead Claire Tully and coach Amanda-Dawn Coderre won the 2014 Alberta Junior Curling Championship with a 6–5 win over 2012 Canadian Junior champion Jocelyn Peterman in the final. This earned them the right to represent Alberta at the 2014 Canadian Junior Curling Championships in Liverpool, Nova Scotia. Alberta went undefeated in their round robin pool which gave them a berth in the championship pool. They finished 9–1 after the championship pool, with their only loss coming at the hands of Nova Scotia's Mary Fay. This meant that the team would go directly to the final, where they would face British Columbia's Kalia Van Osch. Alberta led the entire game and had an inturn hit for the win and the championship. They won in a 7–6 decision. At the 2014 World Junior Curling Championships, the team finished the round robin with a 7–2 record, losing only to Russia and South Korea. They would then face South Korea in the 1 vs. 2 page playoff, but this time would win in a 7–6 decision. Team Rocque would play South Korea again in the final, but would win in a 6-4 decision to capture the gold medal and the championship. It was the first time a Canadian Women's team would win the championship since 2003.

Women's
For the 2014–15 season, McDonald joined Team Chelsea Carey at second, with Laura Crocker as third and Jen Gates as lead. The team would win two tour titles that season, the HDF Insurance Shoot-Out and the Boundary Ford Curling Classic. Team Carey also played in three slams that season, making the playoffs in only the 2014 Canadian Open of Curling, where they lost in the quarterfinals. At the 2015 Alberta Scotties Tournament of Hearts, the team would lose in the finals. Following the 2014–15 season, Carey formed a new team, and was replaced by McDonald's former skip Kelsey Rocque. In their first season together, the Rocque rink won the Red Deer Curling Classic and the CCT Uiseong Masters on the tour. The team played in five slams, making it to the quarterfinals in four events. Team Rocque played in the 2016 Alberta Scotties Tournament of Hearts, but failed to make the playoffs. McDonald played in her first Canada Cup at the 2015 Canada Cup of Curling, where her team finished with a 2–4 record, missing the playoffs. Also during the 2015–16 season, McDonald won the 2016 CIS/CCA Curling Championships with the University of Alberta, qualifying her and teammates Rocque, Danielle Schmiemann, Taylore Theroux and Kristen Streifel for the 2017 Winter Universiade the next season.

The following season, The Rocque rink had less success on the tour. They would play in four slams, making it to the quarterfinals in just one event, the 2016 GSOC Tour Challenge. The team played in the 2016 Canada Cup of Curling, but once again missed the playoffs with a 2–4 record. The team made the decision to miss the 2017 Alberta Scotties Tournament of Hearts so that Rocque and McDonald could participate in the Universiade. The team won gold at the Universiade, beating Russia's Victoria Moiseeva 8–3 in the final. In the 2017–18 season, Team Rocque would win the Curl Mesabi Classic and would play in three slams, making it to the quarterfinals at just the 2018 Meridian Canadian Open. The team played in the 2017 Canadian Olympic Curling Pre-Trials, losing in the playoffs. Midway through the season, Walker took over skipping duties of the team, but remained throwing third stones. The Rocque rink played with the new arrangement at the 2018 Alberta Scotties Tournament of Hearts, where they narrowly missed the playoffs. The next month it was announced that the team would be splitting up. In their final event together, with Rocque off the team, the rink would lose in a tiebreaker at the 2018 Players' Championship with Walker skipping and Kendra Lilly brought in to play third.

In March 2018, McDonald announced she was joining a Winnipeg-based team skipped by Allison Flaxey, with third Kate Cameron and lead Raunora Westcott. The team participated in two Slams and finished sixth at the 2019 Manitoba Scotties Tournament of Hearts. McDonald was invited to be Team Fleury's and team Manitoba's alternate at the 2019 Scotties Tournament of Hearts. She played in one game, Draw 11 against Nunavut, where she curled 75%. McDonald also spared for Fleury at the 2019 Players' Championship where they had a quarterfinal finish.

On March 15, 2019, it was announced that McDonald would join the new team of Laura Walker, Kate Cameron and Nadine Scotland for the 2019–20 season. They did not qualify for the playoffs in their first two events, the 2019 Cargill Curling Training Centre Icebreaker and the Booster Juice Shoot-Out before winning the 2019 Mother Club Fall Curling Classic after posting a perfect 7–0 record. McDonald won her first provincial title this season as well, defeating former teammate Kelsey Rocque 7–4 in the 2020 Alberta Scotties Tournament of Hearts final. Representing Alberta at the 2020 Scotties Tournament of Hearts, the team finished pool play with a 3–4 record, failing to qualify for the championship round. It would be the team's last event of the season as both the Players' Championship and the Champions Cup Grand Slam events were cancelled due to the COVID-19 pandemic.

Due to the pandemic, the 2021 Alberta Scotties were cancelled, so Curling Alberta appointed the Walker rink to represent the province at the 2021 Scotties Tournament of Hearts. Team Walker's regular lead Nadine Scotland, who was three-months pregnant, opted not to play in the tournament, which was being held in a "bubble" due to the pandemic. She was replaced by Rachel Brown. At the Scotties, the team finished with a 9–3 round robin record, tied for third with Manitoba, skipped by Jennifer Jones. Alberta beat Manitoba in the tiebreaker, but lost in the semifinal against the defending champion Team Canada rink, skipped by Kerri Einarson, settling for a bronze medal.

In just their second event of the 2021–22 season, Team Walker reached the final of the 2021 Alberta Curling Series: Saville Shoot-Out where they were defeated by Kim Eun-jung. Due to the pandemic, the qualification process for the 2021 Canadian Olympic Curling Trials had to be modified to qualify enough teams for the championship. In these modifications, Curling Canada created the 2021 Canadian Curling Trials Direct-Entry Event, an event where five teams would compete to try to earn one of three spots into the 2021 Canadian Olympic Curling Trials. Team Walker qualified for the Trials Direct-Entry Event due to their CTRS ranking from the 2019–20 season. At the event, the team went 2–2 through the round robin, qualifying for the tiebreaker round where they faced British Columbia's Corryn Brown. After being defeated by Brown in the first game, Team Walker won the second tiebreaker to secure their spot at the Olympic Trials. The team had one more event before the Trials, the 2021 National Grand Slam, where they lost in the quarterfinals to Tracy Fleury. A few weeks later, they competed in the Olympic Trials, held November 20 to 28 in Saskatoon, Saskatchewan. At the event, the team had mixed results, ultimately finishing in sixth place with a 3–5 record.

A few weeks before the Alberta provincial championship, Team Walker won the Alberta Curling Series: Avonair tour event, defeating Casey Scheidegger in the final. They then competed in the 2022 Alberta Scotties Tournament of Hearts, where they posted a 6–1 record through the round robin. This created a three-way tie between Walker, Scheidegger and the Kelsey Rocque rink, however, as Walker had to best draw shot challenge between the three rinks, they advanced directly to the final. There, they met the Scheidegger rink, who defeated Rocque in the semifinal. After a tight final, Walker secured the victory for her team with a draw to the eight-foot to win 6–5. This qualified the team for their second straight national championship. At the 2022 Scotties Tournament of Hearts, the team could not replicate their success from 2021, finishing the round robin with a 3–5 record and missing the playoffs. Team Walker wrapped up their season at the 2022 Players' Championship where they missed the playoffs.

On March 17, 2022, the team announced that they would be disbanding at the end of the 2021–22 season. It was later announced that McDonald and teammate Kate Hogan would be joining Casey Scheidegger and Jessie Haughian for the 2022–23 season. Scheidegger would skip the team, with Hogan playing third, Haughian at second and McDonald at lead.

Personal life
McDonald currently lives in Edmonton. She is employed as a mortgage broker for Mortgage Design Group. She is married to Kirt Dell.

Teams

Notes

References

External links

Living people
1993 births
Canadian women curlers
University of Alberta alumni
Curlers from Edmonton
Sportspeople from Lethbridge
Curlers from Winnipeg
Universiade gold medalists for Canada
Universiade medalists in curling
Competitors at the 2017 Winter Universiade
Canada Cup (curling) participants
20th-century Canadian women
21st-century Canadian women